Georges Paul Alphonse Emilien Caussade (20 November 1873 – 5 August 1936) was a French composer, music theorist, and music educator.

Biography 
Born in Port Louis, Mauritius, he joined the faculty of the Conservatoire de Paris in 1905 as a teacher of counterpoint. He began teaching fugue at the school as well in 1921; a position his wife, composer Simone Plé-Caussade, took over in 1928. 

Among his notable students are Jehan Alain, Georges Auric, Elsa Barraine, Lili Boulanger, Jean-Yves Daniel-Lesur, Georges Dandelot, Claude Delvincourt, Georges Hugon, Jeanne Leleu, Eugène Lapierre, Gaston Litaize, Paul Pierné, Georges-Émile Tanguay, Henri Tomasi, Marcel Tournier, Germaine Tailleferre and Marios Varvoglis.  

In 1931 he published a book on the subject of harmony, Technique de l'harmonie. His most notable compositions are the operas Selgar et Moina and Légende de Saint George. 

Caussade died aged 62 in Chanteloup-les-Vignes.

1873 births
1936 deaths
Academic staff of the Conservatoire de Paris
French classical composers
French male classical composers
French male non-fiction writers
French music theorists